Francisco Javier Imbroda Ortiz (8 January 1961 – 2 April 2022) was a Spanish basketball coach and politician. He was the sixth coach with the most games directed in the Liga ACB. He was born in Melilla, Spain. He served as a member of the Andalusian Parliament since 2018. He also served as the Regional Minister of Education and Sports since 2019.

Imbroda died from prostate cancer in Malaga, on 2 April 2022, at the age of 61.

References

1961 births
2022 deaths
Spanish politicians
Politicians from Melilla
Members of the 11th Parliament of Andalusia
Spanish basketball coaches
Baloncesto Málaga coaches
Real Madrid basketball coaches
Menorca Bàsquet coaches
Deaths from prostate cancer
Sportspeople from Melilla